Alisa Kleybanova and Galina Voskoboeva were the defending champions but Kleybanova did not participate. Voskoboeva played alongside compatriot Yaroslava Shvedova, but they lost in the final against Chuang Chia-jung and Zhang Shuai, 4–6, 6–1, [11–9].

Seeds

Draw

References 
 Draw

Estoril Open - Doubles
2012 Women's Doubles
Estoril Open